Carlo Allioni (23 September 1728 in Turin – 30 July 1804 in Turin) was an Italian physician and professor of botany at the University of Turin.  His most important work was Flora Pedemontana, sive enumeratio methodica stirpium indigenarum Pedemontii 1755, a study of the plant world in Piedmont, in which he listed 2813 species of plants, of which 237 were previously unknown.  In 1766, he published the Manipulus Insectorum Tauriniensium.

Career

In April, 1758 he was elected a Fellow of the Royal Society.

He was appointed extraordinary professor of  botany at the University of Turin in 1760 and was also the director of the Turin Botanical Garden. The journal Allionia: bollettino dell' istituto ed orto botanico dell' università di Torino is named after him.

First Pehr Löfling and then Linnaeus named the New World herb genus Allionia (Nyctaginaceae) after Allioni. Per Axel Rydberg named the genus Allioniella (now a taxonomic synonym for Mirabilis), after him.

Also named after him are:
 Arabis allionii
 Jovibarba allioni
 Primula allioni
 Veronica allionii

Selected works
Flora Pedemontana, sive, Enumeratio methodica stirpium indigenarum Pedemontii, Turin, 1755.
 Stirpium praecipuarum litoris et agri Nicaensis, Turin, 1755. 
 
Auctarium ad floram Pedemontanam cum notis et emendationibus (1789)
Stirpium praecipuarum littoris et agri Nicaeensis Enumeratio methodica cum Elencho aliquot anirnalium ejusdem maris  (1757)

References

Further reading
Caramiello, R. & Forneris, G. (2004) Le opere minori di Carlo Allioni: dal «Rariorum Pedemontii stirpium» all'«Auctarium ad Floram Pedemontanam». Firenze: Edizioni Olschki

External links

1728 births
1804 deaths
Physicians from Turin
18th-century Italian botanists
Italian entomologists
Fellows of the Royal Society
Academic staff of the University of Turin
Scientists from Turin
Members of the Göttingen Academy of Sciences and Humanities